Boatswain Bird Island, also spelt Boatswainbird Island, is a small island some  off the east coast of Ascension Island in the South Atlantic Ocean with an area of approximately . It is administered from Georgetown on Ascension, which is part of Saint Helena, Ascension and Tristan da Cunha, an overseas territory of the United Kingdom. The southern coast of the island has an impressive natural arch.

Birds
There are thousands of inhabitants on this tiny island, all of which are birds, which give the island its white colour. Among the many seabirds nesting there are boobies, petrels, noddies, as well as the tropicbirds (boatswain birds) for which the island is named.

The island is the home of the majority of Ascension's birds due to rats (accidentally introduced by passing ships) and then cats (introduced to catch the rats, as well as pets) eating the birds and their eggs on Ascension. Since the mid-1990s there has been a feral cat eradication program, alongside a rat eradication program, to encourage the birds back to the main island.

Important Bird Area
The island has been identified as an Important Bird Area (IBA) by BirdLife International as a breeding site for seabirds. Birds for which the IBA is significant include Madeiran storm petrels (1,500 breeding pairs), red-billed tropicbirds (500 pairs), white-tailed tropicbirds (1,000 pairs), Ascension frigatebirds (6,000 pairs), masked boobies (1,300 pairs) and black noddies (5,000 pairs).

References 

Geography of Ascension Island
Uninhabited islands of Saint Helena, Ascension and Tristan da Cunha
Important Bird Areas of Saint Helena
Seabird colonies